Cymatura wallabergeri is a species of beetle in the family Cerambycidae. It was described by Adlbauer in 1994. It is known from Zimbabwe and South Africa.

References

Xylorhizini
Beetles described in 1994